The Enchanted Barn is a 1919 American silent drama film produced by Vitagraph Studios. It was directed by David Smith and starred Bessie Love and J. Frank Glendon. The script was written by Kathryn Reed, based on the novel by Grace Livingston Hill Lutz. Bessie Love had been familiar with the source novel, and was instrumental in optioning it for this film.

The film is considered lost.

Plot 
To care for her ailing mother, young stenographer Shirley (Love) takes her young brother (Butterworth) to find a new home with country air. She finds a barn, owned by the family of Sidney Graham (Glendon), who agrees to rent her the barn. She fixes up the barn, and moves in with her mother and brother.

Shirley overhears a conversation between two men who intend to swindle her new landlord in the sale of a mine. She transcribes their words in a stenographic report, and uses it to foil the deal. Graham is very appreciative, and he and Shirley get to know each other. Shirley falls in love with Graham, but she receives word that he is engaged to another woman.

The two swindlers seek revenge on Shirley by kidnapping her, but she manages to notify Graham by dropping a note out of a car window. He calls the sheriff, who tracks down the swindlers, and Graham himself finds Shirley. Once reunited, it is revealed that Graham is not, in fact, engaged to another woman, and that he is in love with Shirley.

Cast

Release and reception 
Overall, the film received mixed reviews. Bessie Love's performance received good reviews, although it was deemed "much as she has appeared in previous productions". The plot, however, was highly criticized as being thin.

On its release, some theaters showed the film with the Vitagraph comedy short Soapsuds and Sapheads. The film was shown in other theaters with The Dawn of Understanding, which also starred Love, as "Bessie Love Day."

References

External links 

 
 
 

1919 lost films
American black-and-white films
American silent feature films
Silent American drama films
Films based on American novels
Films directed by David Smith (director)
Lost American films
Lost drama films
1910s American films